The Tale of John and Mary is a 1980 Czechoslovak animated film directed by Karel Zeman. This is the last film by Zeman, based on Czech fairy tales. The film is created using cutout animation.

The images of John and Mary were featured at the 200 Czech Crown silver coin minted in memory of Zeman.

References

External links
 

1980 films
Czechoslovak fantasy films
1980s Czech-language films
Films directed by Karel Zeman
Czech animated films
1980s fantasy adventure films
Czech fantasy adventure films
Films with screenplays by Karel Zeman
1980s Czech films
Czech animated adventure films
Czech animated fantasy films